Eddie Khan (born 1935, died 1985 or 1986) was an American jazz bassist who worked extensively with Max Roach, Eric Dolphy, Freddie Hubbard and Andrew Hill.

Discography

As sideman
 Bill Barron: Modern Windows Suite (Savoy Records, 1961)
Walter Bishop, Jr: Bish Bash (Xanadu, 1964 [1975])
 Donald Byrd: Blackjack (Blue Note, 1963–1967)
 Joe Henderson: Our Thing (Blue Note, 1963)
 Andrew Hill: Smokestack (Blue Note, 1963)
 Billie Holiday with the Mal Waldron Quartet: At Monterey 58 (Black Hawk, 1958)
 Freddie Hubbard: Breaking Point (Blue Note, 1964)
 Jackie McLean: One Step Beyond (Blue Note)
 Max Roach: Speak, Brother, Speak! (Fantasy, 1962)
 Shirley Scott: Travelin' Light - with  Kenny Burrell (Prestige, 1964)
With Eric Dolphy
Conversations
 The Illinois Concert (Blue Note, 1963)
Iron Man (Douglas, 1963)
With Slide Hampton
Jazz with a Twist (Atlantic, 1962)
Drum Suite (Epic, 1962)
With Charles Lloyd
Discovery!
With Ronnie Mathews
Doin' the Thang! (Prestige, 1963)
With Jimmy Witherspoon
Blue Spoon (Prestige, 1964)

References

American jazz double-bassists
Male double-bassists
1935 births
Living people
21st-century double-bassists
21st-century American male musicians
American male jazz musicians